Count Matvei Ivanovich Platov (8 (19) August 1753 – 3 (15) January 1818) was a Russian general who commanded the Don Cossacks in the Napoleonic wars and founded Novocherkassk as the new capital of the Don Host Province.

Biography
Platov was born in Pribilyanskoe and began his service in the Don Cossacks in 1766 becoming an yesaul in 1769. He distinguished himself in the 1771 Crimean campaign and was promoted to the command of a Cossack regiment in 1772. Between 1774 and 1784 he fought against the Crimean Tatars, in 1774 and again in 1782 serving under Alexander Suvorov in the Kuban Valley, Chechnya and Dagestan. In 1790 he was awarded the Order of St George (4th Class) for his participation in the capture of Ochakov, and after actions in Akkerman, Bender, and Kaushani for which he was promoted to brigadier general, he was awarded the Order of St George (3rd Class) for the storming of Izmail. For his bravery during the assault he was promoted to ataman of the Ekaterinoslav and Chuguev Cossacks, and on 12 January 1793 he was promoted to major-general. During 1796 he was awarded the Order of St. Vladimir (3rd class) and a golden sword for courage in the Persian Campaign.

Disgraced by the Emperor Paul I of Russia as a result of rumours spread by the emperor's courtiers, he was exiled to Kostroma, but later confined to the Peter and Paul Fortress. However, after verifying his innocence, the Emperor  awarded him the Commander's Cross of the Order of St. John of Jerusalem. Unfortunately, this also led to his appointment to the ill-fated and ill-conceived Russian expedition to India in 1800. Although the expedition only reached Orenburg,  Platov was promoted to Lieutenant-General and pokhidnii ataman (campaign leader) of the Don Cossacks with a transfer to their HQ at Novocherkask.

Upon Alexander I's accession to the throne, he was appointed ataman of the Don Cossacks. In 1805, he ordered the Cossack capital to be moved from Starocherkassk to a new location, known as Novocherkassk.

During the Polish campaign of 1806-1807, Platov commanded a Cossack corps and fought against the French at the battles of  Eylau, Guttstadt and Friedland, receiving the orders of St.George (2nd class), of St. Alexander Nevsky, and the Prussian orders of the Black Eagle and of the Red Eagle. In 1808-1809, he was active against the Turks in the Danube valley, including at the Battle of Silistra, receiving for it the Order of St.Vladimir (1st class). On 11 October 1809 Platov was promoted to General of Cavalry. Soon after the end of the campaign he returned to the Don Host and continued the reorganisation of the local Cossack administration.

In 1812, Platov supported General Bagration's 2nd Western Army with a Cossack corps at the Korelichi engagement, at Mir and at Romanovo, providing the rear guard during their retreat towards Mogilyov. During the Russian counter-attack at Smolensk Platov fought at Molevo Boloto. At the Battle of Borodino he, together with General of Cavalry Fyodor Uvarov, conducted a manoeuver against the French left (northern) flank, but failed to effectively threaten the French, resulting in Platov not receiving a decoration for the battle although ironically it was later disclosed that this raid had a dramatic effect on Napoleon, causing him to hold back the French Imperial Guard. He hounded the French during their retreat from Moscow in 1812, (for which he received the title of Count of the Russian Empire), and again after their defeat at the Battle of Leipzig 1813 in Saxony (see Battle of Altenberg, 28 September 1813).

Platov later accompanied emperor Alexander to London where he was awarded a golden sword and an honorary degree by the University of Oxford. A full-length portrait was painted by Sir Thomas Lawrence for the Waterloo Chamber created at Windsor Castle by George IV, then prince regent. Platov then settled in the Cossack capital of Novocherkassk where he established a school and was head of the local administration. He is buried in the Novocherkassk Cathedral.  He died, aged 67, in  Epanchitskoe (near Taganrog).

The first monument to Platov, which existed from 1853 to 1923 in Novocherkassk, was replicated there in 1993. There are also equestrian monuments to him in Novocherkassk, Rostov-on-Don and Moscow. Gavrila Derzhavin dedicated the last of his odes to Platov's exploits. In Leskov's Levsha (1881), Don Cossack Platov is a prominent figure, even though his portrayal in that folk-styled tale is full of anachronisms.

An international airport that serves Rostov-on-Don and opened in 2017 was named after Platov. A street in the historic old town of Niagara-on-the-Lake, Ontario, Canada is also named after Platov. It is spelled Platoff Street.

From May 1813 to the present, at least 18 ships have been named after ataman of the Don Army M.I. Platov (see list of ships named Platov or Platoff).Ru

Notes

Sources
 Mikaberidze, Alexander, The Russian officer Corps in the Revolutionary and Napoleonic wars 1792-1815, Savas Beatie, New York, 2005

References 
The Dictionary of Russian Generals in Napoleonic Wars. 
Platov in Napoleonic wars
Biography of Platov

1753 births
1818 deaths
People from Aksaysky District
Russian commanders of the Napoleonic Wars
Russian nobility
Don Cossacks
People of the Russo-Persian Wars
Cavalry commanders
Russian city founders
Recipients of the Order of St. George of the Second Degree
Recipients of the Order of St. George of the Third Degree
Atamans